Alipore Assembly constituency was a Legislative Assembly constituency of South 24 Parganas district in the Indian state of West Bengal.

Overview
As a consequence of the orders of the Delimitation Commission, Alipore Assembly constituency ceases to exist from 2011.
 
It was part of Kolkata Dakshin (Lok Sabha constituency),

Around half of the electorate of the constituency were slum dwellers.

Members of Legislative Assembly

Election results

2009 Bye-election
A bye-election was held on 10 November 2009 following the resignation of the sitting MLA, Tapas Paul who was elected as MP In Parliament from Krishnanagar (Lok Sabha constituency). Firhad Hakim of Trinamool Congress Defeated Kaustav Chatterjee of CPIM.

2006
In the 2006 election, Tapas Paul of Trinamool Congress defeated his nearest rival Biplab Chatterjee of CPI(M).

1977-2009
In the 2009 by-election, Firhad Hakim (Bobby) of Trinamool Congress won the 148 Alipore assembly seat. The by-election was necessitated by the election of sitting MLA, Tapas Paul, to the Lok Sabha from the Krishnanagar (Lok Sabha constituency). In 2006 and 2001 elections to the state assembly, Tapas Paul of Trinamool Congress won the seat defeating his nearest rivals Biplab Chatterjee  and Mira Bhowmick respectively, both of CPI(M). Saugata Roy of Congress defeated Rathindranath Roy Choudhury of CPI(M) in 1996, Tarhin Roy Choudhury of CPI(M) in 1991, and Ashoke Bose of CPI(M) in 1987. Anup Kumar Chandra of Congress defeated Ashok Kumar Bose of CPI(M) in 1982. Ashoke Kumar Bose of CPI(M) defeated Salai Baran Chatterjee of Janata Party in 1977.

1951-1972
Kanailal Sarkar of Congress won in 1972 and 1971. Mani Sanyal of CPI won in 1969 and 1967. Somnath Lahiri of CPI won in 1962 and 1957. In independent India’s first election in 1951, Satendra Kumar Basu of Congress won the Alipur seat.

References

Former assembly constituencies of West Bengal
Politics of South 24 Parganas district
Alipore